Paul Begaud is an Australian born songwriter, record producer and singer.  He has written and/or produced songs for artists including Delta Goodrem, Tina Arena, Human Nature, Terri Clark, Honeyz, R&B Singer Selwyn (singer), Donny Osmond and country hall of fame star Wynonna Judd.  Begaud's most notable songs include the US Country #1 "Now That I Found You" recorded by Terri Clark and the UK R&B #1 "End of the Line" (Top 5 UK Singles Chart) recorded by UK girl group Honeyz. Begaud also composed the song "Dare to Dream" for the Sydney Olympic Games Opening Ceremony performed by Olivia Newton-John and John Farnham before a global audience of 4.5 billion.  Begaud is a 3 x ARIA Producer Of The Year nominee.

Background

Begaud started singing and performing professionally at age 12 as a member of Australian children's group "The Keane Kids".  The group performed in clubs and television throughout Australia.  Other notable members of the group included TV celebrity Toni Pearen.

Begaud went on to sign a solo recording contract with BMG releasing music in Australia and also under the pseudonym Paul Bennett (Bennett is Begaud's mother's maiden name) in Asia and Germany, and leading to a nomination for the Bravo Otto award for best male singer alongside Michael Jackson and Prince.  His best known song is "Forevermore" which was a number 1 hit in Asia.  "Forevermore" has amassed more than 2 million plays on YouTube.  "Forevermore" was covered by Filipino singer Jed Madela on his 2007 album Only Human.

Begaud's first success as a record producer came with Australian boy band Human Nature.  Begaud worked with the group for a year before they were signed to Sony Music, co-writing their songs and developing their sound. 
Human Nature's first album "Telling Everybody" went 4 x Platinum and was a major success for the band and Begaud.  Begaud co-wrote and produced 7 tracks on the album, including hit singles "Got It Goin’ On", "Tellin’ Everybody", "Whisper Your Name" and "Don’t Say Goodbye".  "Don't Say Goodbye" was nominated for Highest Selling Single at the ARIA Music Awards.  Begaud has contributed on several Human Nature hit albums.

Begaud's US Country #1 "Now That I Found You" (Terri Clark) was co-written with US #1 songwriters Vanessa Corish and JD Martin.  The song was awarded ASCAP and BMI (Broadcast Music, Inc.) performance awards along with the prestigious BMI Millionaires award which denotes in excess of 1 million airplays in the US alone.

Begaud, along with songwriters Vanessa Corish and Wayne Tester composed "Dare To Dream" especially for the Sydney Olympic Games Opening Ceremony. Olivia Newton-John and John Farnham walked among the Olympic competitors in what is remembered as a memorable and emotional Olympic moment.

Begaud, again along with writing partner Vanessa Corish composed and produced the Song Of Peace for the 2006 Asian Games held in Doha, Qatar.  The song entitled "Reach Out" was performed at the Opening Ceremony by renowned Bollywood playback singer Sunidhi Chauhan.  The Asian Games are the largest sporting event in the world after the Summer Olympic Games, and are watched by an estimated 3 billion people across Asia and the world, making the Ceremonies of the Doha 2006 Asian Games the biggest branding exercise ever undertaken by any Arab nation.

Begaud has provided A&R consultancy services to major music labels, discovering new talent, offering creative advice and developing artists.

On 27 March 2015 Begaud's song "End of the Line" (Honeyz) was selected by UK's Official Charts website as the number one "Ultimate Goodbye Song".  Runner-up songs on the list included Beyonce's "Irreplaceable", Mariah Carey's "Always Be My Baby", Spice Girls "Goodbye" and N-Sync's "Bye Bye Bye".

Awards and nominations
 ARIA 3 x Producer Of the Year Nominee
 BMI (Broadcast Music, Inc.) Performance Award "Now That I Found You"
 BMI (Broadcast Music, Inc.) Millionaires Award "Now That I Found You"

References

Australian record producers
Australian singer-songwriters
Living people
Year of birth missing (living people)